Albert David George Cowell (1 November 1870 – 27 April 1937) was an Australian rules footballer who played with Collingwood and Carlton in the Victorian Football League (VFL).

Family
The third of 12 children born to Edmund Cowell (1843–1918), and Caroline Cowell (1841–1910), née Pierpoint, Albert David George Cowell was born at Ballarat East on 1 November 1870.

George Cowell married Emily Maud Nichols (1869–1942) in early 1894 and they had three children: Charles Aubrey Nicholas Cowell (1894–1917), Lydia Amy Isabel Cowell (1896–1971), later Mrs. Hector Godfrey Smith, and George Cowell (1897–1970).

Football

South Ballarat
Originally from Beaufort, Cowell played with South Ballarat in 1896.

Collingwood
Cowell played 11 games with Collingwood in the 1898 VFL season.

Carlton
Cowell transferred to Carlton at the start of the 1899 VFL season and played seven games for the Blues.

North Melbourne
Cowell then transferred to North Melbourne at the start of the 1900 season but played only a single senior game for them in Round 1.

Later life
Cowell worked as a baker and pastrycook, returning to Ballarat after his football career where he died in April 1937.

Notes

External links 
 
 
 George Cowell's playing statistics from The VFA Project
 George Cowell's profile at Blueseum
 George Cowell's profile at Collingwood Forever

1870 births
1937 deaths
Australian rules footballers from Victoria (Australia)
South Ballarat Football Club players
Collingwood Football Club players
Carlton Football Club players
North Melbourne Football Club (VFA) players